State Highway 91 (abbreviated SH-91 or OK-91) is a state highway in the U.S. state of Oklahoma. SH-91 has no lettered spur routes.

Route description
SH-91 begins at Denison Dam at Lake Texoma, connecting to Texas State Highway 91 and heading north.  Shortly after reaching the shore it turns east to run through Cartwright. It then has an interchange with US-69 / US-75 near Colbert. SH-91 then ends at SH-78 in Achille.

History
SH-91 was originally State Highway 75A, but was renumbered as a continuation of SH 91 in Texas.

Junction list

References

External links

 SH-91 at Roadklahoma

091
Transportation in Bryan County, Oklahoma